Legislative elections were held in France between 12 and 21 October 1795 (20 to 29 Vendémiaire, Year IV) to elect one-third of the members of the Council of Five Hundred and the Council of Ancients, the lower and upper houses of the legislature. The elections were held in accordance with the Constitution of the Year III and the first under the Directory regime.

Background
During the summer of 1795, following the Thermidorian Reaction, the members of the National Assembly began working on a new constitution which wouldn't favour any certain party or group, while providing more support to the 'Middle Group' (later becoming The Plain) and avoiding any extreme use of power seen during the Reign of Terror of Maximilien Robespierre.  Under the Constitution of the Year III, 'The Directory' or La Directoire was established, which was a mix of the two former constitutions (1791 and 1793).  The Directory was split into 'two branches' (upper house, the Council of Ancients made up of independent senior politicians; and the lower house, the Council of Five Hundred, which was elected by land owning tax paying men) with a 'third executive' (the Directory Body).  The new system is seen by many historians as imitating the British parliamentary system, while expanding on what is now known as the 'French System' of a separate executive and assembly, which work in conjunction however (this being a mix of Parliamentary and Presidential, today known as Semi-presidential).

With the approaching election, the Royalists (known collectively as the Monarchists) hope to take advantage of the elections and see a return to the monarchy and campaign together in many regions.  Fearing a monarchist outcome, the 'Republicans' (Jacobins, Thermidorians, and Montagnards) pass a law, known as the 2/3rds decree, which saw each of houses of the directory contain those many members from the convention.  However, following the 13 Vendémiaire royalist insurrection, the 2/3rds principle became a hated law by members of the royalist and anti-radical parties.

Results
The 1795 began seeing a large swing in support of constitutional royalists, now known as 'Clichyens', named after the Clichy Club, especially following the Reign of Terror and failures of the government of the French Constitution of 1793.  Though the Royalists disagreed on who they would want to see as the proper pretender to the throne, they did in-fact agree that legally being elected would be the only means which they would re-establish the monarchy.  Then, they would call for the dissolution of the Directory, but see the recreation of the Constitution of 1791 with a new National Assembly.  The Royalists were also divided on the future however, with the Absolutists (later known as the Ultra Royalists) preferring a return to the absolute Ancien Régime under Louis, Count of Provence (future Louis XVIII)  and supported the now two-year old Quiberon Expedition.  The 'Constitutionalists' (later known as the Liberals or Doctrinaires) favoured a constitutional monarchy in addition to supporting individual rights and property in addition to freedoms and fair elections.  The constitutionalists later began meeting at the 'Clichy Club', hence the new name, in addition to their nickname, the 'Clichyens'.

References

Works cited

 
 
 

Legislative
18th-century elections in Europe
French Directory
1795 events of the French Revolution
18th-century elections in France
Legislative elections in France